Claudie Sabajo (married Doornkamp) is a Surinamese politician.  She has been a member of the National Assembly of Suriname since 2020, representing Marowijne District for the National Democratic Party (NDP).

Biography 

Sabajo is a mother and of Lokono indigenous descent.   She is a member of the women's organization of Marijkedorp.  From at least 2018 to 2020, she was a board member of the Regional Health Service.  In 2018, she started a business in wedding and birthday cakes, which grew out of a hobby she had since the age of 20. She is also employed by the national electricity utility Energiebedrijven Suriname.

Since at least 2012, Sabajo has been the chairperson of the National Democratic Party's Albina subdivision. In 2018, she joined the Marowijne District Council.  In 2019, she was part of the ruling NDP's delegation that made a working visit to the Communist Party of China in Beijing.  During the 2020 general elections, she was the lijsttrekker for her party in Marowijne, and won a seat in the National Assembly.

References

External links 

 Profile at the National Assembly

Living people
Surinamese people of indigenous peoples descent
Indigenous politicians of the Americas
National Democratic Party (Suriname) politicians
Members of the National Assembly (Suriname)
People from Marowijne District
21st-century Surinamese politicians
Year of birth missing (living people)
21st-century Surinamese women politicians